Kristian Halse (14 December 1926 in Stangvik – 6 November 2018) was a Norwegian politician for the Liberal Party.

He served as a deputy representative to the Norwegian Parliament from Nordland during the term 1969–1973. From 1972 to 1973 he sat as a regular representative, replacing Johan Kleppe who was appointed to the cabinet Korvald.

Halse was involved in local politics in Vefsn municipality from 1962 to 1971.

References

References

1926 births
2018 deaths
Liberal Party (Norway) politicians
Members of the Storting
20th-century Norwegian politicians